Since its origin in 600 BC, the city of Patna  has gone through many name changes. The article lists various name of Patna used throughout its history. The article could also be taken as Toponymy of Patna.

Pataligram
One legend ascribes the origin of city to a mythological king, Putraka, who created Patna by a magic stroke for his queen Patali, literally trumpet flower, which gives it its ancient name Pataligram. Gram is the Sanskrit word for a village.

Patliputra

The name Patliputra (Devanagari: पाटलिपुत्र ) is composed (sandhi) of two words, Patali and Putraka (king).
The name Patliputra was given by a king of ancient Indian state of Magadh, Ajatashatru, who created  a fort in Pataligrama near the River Ganges in 490 BC and later king Ajatashatru shifted his capital to Patliputra.

The name Patliputra may also have been derived from Patli, a tree variety that is found in the city. Indeed, according to the Mahāparinibbāṇa Sutta (Sutta 16 of the Dīgha Nikāya), Pāṭaliputta was the place "where the seedpods of the Pāṭali plant break open".

Pa-lin-fou
The Chinese called the place as Pa-lin-fou. This name appears in books of Chinese travellers, Fa Hien & Hsüan-tsang who visited Patliputra.

Palibothra
This name was mentioned by Megasthenes (350 BCE-290 BCE), the Greek historian, (calling it 'Palibothra'(Devanagari: पलिबोथरा) or 'Palimbotra' (Devanagari: पलिम्बोत्र), in his writings during the 4th century.

Azimabad

Prince Azim-us-Shan, the grandson of Aurangzeb came as the Governor of Patliputra in 1703. Earlier than that Sher Shah Suri had moved his capital from Bihar Sharif to Patliputra. It was prince Azim-us-Shan who gave it the name Azimabad.

See also
 Azimabad
 Magadh

References

Further reading
 
 
 Legge, James 1886. A Record of Buddhistic Kingdoms: Being an account by the Chinese Monk Fa-Hien of his travels in India and Ceylon (A.D. 399-414) in search of the Buddhist Books of Discipline. Oxford, Clarendon Press. Reprint: New York, Paragon Book Reprint Corp. 1965. 

History of Patna
Patna
Geographic history of India